Rulers of India may refer to:

 Lists of rulers of India
 Rulers of India series edited by William Wilson Hunter